Esther Grether (nee Kast, born ) is a Swiss art collector and businesswoman. In February 2023, Forbes estimated her and her net worth at US$1.5 billion.

Early life
Esther Grether was born Esther Kast around 1936.

Business
She inherited a beauty and health care products company from her late husband Hans Grether in 1975 that she continues to run with her daughters. She has been chair of the board of the Basel-based Doetsch Grether Group for more than thirty years. She has served on the Swatch Group's Board of Directors from 1986 until 2014.

In 2013 Forbes magazine estimated her and her family's net worth at US$1.5 billion.

Art collection
Grether possesses one of the most valuable collections of 20th-century art in the world. Her collection reportedly includes more than 600 pieces and includes works by Pablo Picasso, Paul Cézanne, Salvador Dalí, Francis Bacon and Alberto Giacometti. The collection is kept in a converted printing factory which is also her home. Grether owns Bacon's Triptych, May–June 1973 (one of Bacon's three "Black Triptychs") which she purchased at auction in 1989 for $6.3 million, a record price for a Bacon painting at that time. She is also believed to own three other Bacon triptychs from the 1970s.

In December 1962, it was thanks to a bank guarantee provided by Hans Grether, secured on Doetsch Grether shares, that the Basel art dealer Ernst Beyeler was able to buy the American collector G. David Thompson's entire collection of 70 Giacometti works.

References

External links
Doetsch Grether AG - About us

Living people
1930s births
Swiss billionaires
Swiss art collectors
Women art collectors
Female billionaires
Businesspeople from Basel-Stadt